Walger is a German surname. Notable people with the surname include:

Dennis Walger (born 1984), German international rugby union player
Markus Walger (born 1979), German international rugby union player
Sonya Walger (born 1974), English actress

See also 
Walgerbach, river of district Marburg-Biedenkopf in Hesse, Germany

References

German-language surnames